D. Matt Geller   has been a veteran independent producer specializing in scripted development, film financing (domestic & international), project packaging, and physical production. 
He currently serves as President of Josephson Entertainment. He is a member of the P.G.A.

Early life and education
Geller was born in Minsk, USSR then immigrated to US in 1992
Geller attended the State University of New York at New Paltz.

Career
D. Matt Geller is President of Josephson Entertainment overseeing the Film & Television divisions. 

Previously, Geller’s producing credits included the feature film REMEMBER.  It starred Academy Award winners Christopher Plummer and Martin Landau, directed by two-time Academy Award nominated director Atom Egoyan.  The film had its world premiere at the Toronto Film Festival and was in competition at the Venice Film Festival. It was distributed theatrically by A24.  The second film was a Chet Baker biopic, BORN TO BE BLUE, which starred Academy Award nominee Ethan Hawke. The film premiered at the Toronto Film Festival as a specialty selection and was distributed theatrically by IFC.

In television, Geller produced the half-hour comedy FOUR IN THE MORNING, written by Ira Parker. Ordered straight to series by the CBC, the show explored a romanticized look at life in your twenties, following a group of friends on their adventures at four o'clock in the morning. He also produced a one-hour, high-octane conspiracy series DEPARTURE for Peacock, NBCUniversal’s streaming service.  The show reunited Geller with actor, Christopher Plummer. 

Prior to joining Josephson, Geller held executive positions at RAZE, a media company co-founded by Sofia Vergara; Six Point Films, a production company owned by Branko Lustig, who received Academy Awards for producing SCHINDLER’S LIST and GLADIATOR.  Geller also oversaw the director-driven production company, Wonderfalls Entertainment, spearheaded by Kristin Hanggi, who was nominated for a Tony Award for creating the musical ROCK OF AGES. 

Geller held a creative position at Lightworks Pictures, specializing in producing branded franchises of Christian Booksellers Association (CBA) novels with partner Sony AFFIRM. He oversaw the production of a reality series, AMERICAN BIBLE CHALLENGE for the Game Show Network and the documentary SERVING LIFE, narrated by Forest Whitaker. The film was purchased by Oprah Winfrey’s OWN and subsequently won the Humanitas Award. 

Geller also tenured at Focus Features where he worked on distribution campaigns for such films as HOT FUZZ, EASTERN PROMISES, LUST, CAUTION and ATONEMENT (BAFTA Award). In television, he was a development executive at DLT Entertainment, working on BBC1’s comedy MY FAMILY, the reunion specials of the hit comedy AS TIME GOES BY, starring Dame Judi Dench, a Russian version of THREE’S COMPANY for REN TV, and US distribution of the Australian soap opera NEIGHBOURS on Oxygen Media.

Geller, who was born in the former Soviet Union, is a member of the Producers Guild of America (PGA) and the British Academy of Film and Television Arts (BAFTA) and the Television Academy of Arts & Sciences. He currently resides in Los Angeles, CA with his wife and children.

External links
 The Hollywood Reporter - Alan Cumming Joins Animated 'Bremen Town Musicians' 
 The Hollywood Reporter - 'Cats & Dogs' Director Tackles 'Bremen Town Musicians' Folk Tale
 Variety - ‘Remember the Titans’ Scribe to Pen World War II Drama ‘Night Witches’
 Reuters - California Pictures Inks Deal With M2 and Geller Entertainment Group to Produce Boondock Saints Episodes

Living people
Year of birth missing (living people)